Pseudomonas straminea is a Gram-negative, rod bacterium that includes strains formerly identified as P. ochracea. Based on 16S rRNA analysis, P. straminea has been placed in the P. aeruginosa group.

References

External links
Type strain of Pseudomonas straminea at BacDive -  the Bacterial Diversity Metadatabase

Pseudomonadales
Bacteria described in 1963